His Parisian Wife is a lost 1919 silent film romantic drama produced by Famous Players-Lasky and distributed by Paramount Pictures. It was directed by Emile Chautard and starred Elsie Ferguson. The source for this picture was the novel The Green Orchard by Andrew Soutar.

Plot
As described in a film magazine, Martin Wesley (Powell) marries the young French woman Fauvette (Ferguson), but she is out of place in the cold New England setting he provides her. After he begins to suspect her due to the distrust of his puritan relatives, they separate. Fauvette becomes a famous author, but her generosity exceeds her income. She is in difficulties with a money lender when Martin returns to woo her again. They find their love revived in the more genial atmosphere of New York City.

Cast
Elsie Ferguson - Fauvette
David Powell - Martin Wesley
Courtenay Foote - Tony Rye
Frank Losee - Thompson Wesley
Cora Williams - Mrs. Wesley
Charles W. Charles - Minister (as Captain Charles
Louis R. Grisel - Lawyer (as Louis Grizel)

See also
The Green Orchard (1916)

References

External links
 

Danish lobby poster

1919 films
American silent feature films
Lost American films
Films based on British novels
Films directed by Emile Chautard
1919 romantic drama films
American romantic drama films
American black-and-white films
American remakes of British films
1910s American films
Silent romantic drama films
Silent American drama films
1919 lost films
Lost romantic drama films
1910s English-language films